Conor O. Burke is a baseball coach and former outfielder, who is the current head baseball coach of the Iona Gaels. He played college baseball at Suffolk County Community College and Guilford Technical Community College before transferring to Queens where he played from 2011 to 2012.

Playing career
Burke attended St. Dominic High School, in Oyster Bay, New York and played college baseball at Suffolk County Community College and Guilford Technical Community College. As a sophomore at Guilford Tech, Burke batted .194 with one homerun and 2 RBI. For his final two years of college baseball, Burke transferred to Queens College. As a junior, Burke batted .252 with one homerun and 12 RBI.

Coaching career
Immediately following the conclusion of his playing career, Burke joined the coaching staff of his alma mater, Queens College. For the 2014 season, Burke joined the staff at Concordia College (New York). He made another move prior to the start of the 2015 season, joining Adelphi University working with their infielders and outfielders. He landed his first NCAA Division I job in the summer of 2015, joining Steve Trimper's staff at Maine. When Trimper left for Stetson the following summer, new head coach Nick Derba retained Burke on his staff. On August 29, 2019, he joined the coaching staff at Dartmouth.

On August 19, 2021, Burke was named the head baseball coach of the Iona Gaels.

Head coaching record

References

Iona Gaels bio

Living people
Year of birth missing (living people)
Baseball players from New York (state)
Adelphi Panthers baseball coaches
Concordia Clippers baseball coaches
Dartmouth Big Green baseball coaches
Maine Black Bears baseball coaches
Queens Knights baseball coaches
Queens Knights baseball players
Junior college baseball players in the United States